The Brave was a 74-gun Argonaute class ship of the line of the French Navy.

Commissioned in 1781, she was put in the reserve in 1788, but reactivated in March 1791. Two years later, she was decommissioned again, and razeed to a 52-gun frigate. She took part in the Biscay campaign of June 1795 under Captain Antoine René Thévenard.

She later served under Captain Rolland, and was used as a hulk in Toulon from 1798.

Sources and references

Ships of the line of the French Navy
Argonaute-class ships of the line
1781 ships